Stefanis Michael (born 8 November 1946) is a Cypriot former footballer who played as a midfielder and made 35 appearances for the Cyprus national team.

Career
Michael made his debut for Cyprus on 23 November 1968 in a 1970 FIFA World Cup qualification match against West Germany, which finished as a 0–1 loss. He went on to make 35 appearances, scoring 2 goals, before making his last appearance on 11 January 1978 in a friendly match against Greece, which finished as a 0–2 loss.

Career statistics

International

International goals

References

External links
 
 
 

1946 births
Living people
Cypriot footballers
Cyprus international footballers
Association football midfielders
APOEL FC players
Cypriot First Division players